Sharpe may refer to:
 Sharpe (surname), people with the surname Sharpe
 Sharpe, Kansas, a community in the United States
 Sharpe, Kentucky, a community in the United States
 Sharpe James, American politician, New Jersey
 Sharpe (novel series), series of historical novels written by Bernard Cornwell
 Richard Sharpe (fictional character), the title character of the Sharpe series by Bernard Cornwell
 Sharpe (TV series), the television series based on Cornwell's books
 Sharpe ratio, financial statistic describing portfolio returns
 Lake Sharpe, created by the construction of Big Bend Dam in South Dakota
 Sharpe Field, a private airport in Alabama, United States
 R. v. Sharpe, Canadian legal proceedings

See also 
 Sharp (disambiguation)
 Sharpie (disambiguation)
 Sharps (disambiguation)
 Justice Sharpe (disambiguation)